Dúhy (Rainbows) is the thirteenth studio album by Slovak singer Miroslav Žbirka, released on Universal Music in 2005.

Track listing

Official releases
 2005: Dúhy, CD, Universal Music, No. 987 373-5
 2006: Dúhy: The Best of Tour, CD/DVD, Universal Music, #170 824-4

Credits and personnel

 Miroslav Žbirka – lead vocal, writer, acoustic guitar, co-producer
 Marika Gombitová – lead vocal
 Iva Frühlingová – lead vocal
 Aleš Zenkl – producer

 Honza Horáček – producer
 David Koller – back vocal, producer
 Jan P. Muchow – producer
 Jiří Charypar – mastered-by

Charts

References

General

Specific

External links 
 
 

2005 albums
Miroslav Žbirka albums
Marika Gombitová albums